Butchertown may refer to:
 Butchertown, Casey County, Kentucky
 Butchertown, Louisville, Kentucky
 Butchertown, a neighborhood in San Francisco
 Butchertown, a neighborhood in Walkerville, Montana